Johnny Got His Gun is a 1971 American drama anti-war film written and directed by Dalton Trumbo, in his directorial debut, based on his 1939 novel of the same name, with an uncredited writing collaboration by Luis Buñuel. The film stars Timothy Bottoms, Kathy Fields, Marsha Hunt, Jason Robards, Donald Sutherland and Diane Varsi. It was Trumbo's first and only directorial effort.

Although a minor success on initial release, it was largely forgotten soon after by mass audiences. It regained public recognition when clips of it were incorporated into the music video for Metallica's song "One", whose popularity subsequently turned Johnny Got His Gun into a cult film. Eventually, Metallica bought the film rights in order to keep showing the music video without having to pay additional royalty fees.

Plot 
Joe Bonham (Bottoms), a young American soldier during World War I, awakens in a hospital bed after being hit by an artillery shell. He has lost his eyes, ears, mouth, nose, and limbs, but remains conscious and able to reason, rendering him a prisoner in his own body. As he drifts between reality and fantasy, he remembers his old life with his family and his girlfriend Kareen (Kathy Fields). He also forms a bond of sorts with a young nurse (Diane Varsi) who senses his plight.

Eventually, Joe tries to communicate with his doctors by banging his head against his pillow in Morse code, spelling out "help". He requests for the Army to put him in a glass coffin in a freak show as a demonstration of the horrors of war. When told that this is against regulations, he responds by repeatedly begging to be euthanized.

He ultimately realizes that the Army cannot grant either wish, and will leave him in a state of living death. His sympathetic nurse attempts to euthanize him by clamping his breathing tube, but her supervisor stops her before Joe can succumb. Joe realizes that he will be forced to live out the rest of his natural life in his state of entrapment and is left alone, weakly chanting, "S.O.S. Help me."

Cast 
 Timothy Bottoms as Joe Bonham
 Kathy Fields as Kareen
 Marsha Hunt as Joe's Mother
 Jason Robards as Joe's Father
 Donald Sutherland as Christ
 David Soul as Swede World War I Soldier
 Anthony Geary as Redhead World War I Soldier
 Charles McGraw as Mike Burkeman
 Sandy Brown Wyeth as Lucky
 Don 'Red' Barry as Jody Simmons (billed as Donald Barry)
 Diane Varsi as Nurse #4

Production 
In 1966, Bruce Campbell teamed up with Trumbo, who wrote a film script and was attached to direct. The project was initially set up at Warner Bros. but fell through. Campbell and Trumbo invested $80,000 and attracted 25 investors to invest $600,000 in the film. The total cash outlay for the film was $750,000 but deferred technical fees put the budget over $1 million.

The film distinguishes between Joe's reality and fantasy with black-and-white for the hospital, and color for his dreams and memories. His dreams are drug-induced, as when he talks to his dead father and Jesus Christ, with the color being saturated. His memories are in a clearer color, such as the fishing trip and his last night with Kareen. Joe's injuries are never seen in the hospital scenes; his face is covered by a mask and his body by the hospital sheets.

Release
The film was entered into the 1971 Cannes Film Festival and North American distribution rights were acquired by Cinemation Industries. The film opened on August 4, 1971 at the RKO 59th Street Twins in New York City. All servicemen were admitted free.

Home media
The film was released on DVD in the U.S on April 28, 2009, via Shout! Factory.

Reception 
The film won the Grand Prix Spécial du Jury and the FIPRESCI Prize at the Cannes Film Festival.

Roger Ebert gave the film a full four-star grade and wrote that Trumbo has handled the material, "strange to say, in a way that's not so much anti-war as pro-life. Perhaps that's why I admire it. Instead of belaboring ironic points about the 'war to end war,' Trumbo remains stubbornly on the human level. He lets his ideology grow out of his characters, instead of imposing it from above."

Roger Greenspun of The New York Times, however, stated that much of the film was "a mess of clichéd, imprecise sentimentalizing and fantasizing. On any terms that I might recognize and possibly credit, 'Johnny Got His Gun' is a stultifyingly bad movie." Gene Siskel of the Chicago Tribune gave the film two-and-a-half stars out of four. He reported that he saw it twice and found it the first time to be "as savagely effective as any antiwar film," but the second time "it didn't work at all," with the color flashback scenes "poorly acted and scripted" and the dreams "frequently much too detailed and barely illusory. In the black-and-white sequences, Trumbo is much more disciplined and effective." Charles Champlin of the Los Angeles Times wrote that the film "seems too late—a passionate anti-war sermon arriving at a time when the sermon has been done often and better, and more to the point has long since been accepted by the congregation. Paradoxically, the particular horror which Trumbo lays before us is at once so special and terrible and so manifestly symbolic, that by the end it has lost much of its power to move us. You admire the passion but cannot be sure what it achieved." Tom Shales of The Washington Post said that the film "means well," but "Trumbo is not nearly sophisticated enough as a writer, nor proficient enough as a director, to either grip or alarm us for very long ... Trumbo can't decide whether to fill his movie with symbols or people, so the screenplay is usually hollow and vague and never quite true." Tom Milne of The Monthly Film Bulletin thought the film "might have worked" if Trumbo had "treated the whole film in the black-and-white, expressionist manner of the hospital scenes," but the flashback and fantasy sequences "not only reveal influences as varied and ill-advised as Fellini and M*A*S*H, but provide Joe with a very mundane and rather lachrymose biography; the Unknown Soldier is no longer an awesome symbol when he is provided with a name, rank and serial number."

The film has a 67% rating on Rotten Tomatoes based on 21 reviews.

By September 30, 1972, the film had earned theatrical rentals of $767,794 in the United States and Canada.

The Japanese filmmaker Akira Kurosawa cited Johnny Got His Gun as one of his favorite films.

Legacy 
In 1989, heavy metal band Metallica released the song "One" and used clips from the film in the song's music video.

In the 2008 remake, actor Benjamin McKenzie performed as Joe Bonham in the "live on stage, on film" version of the 1982 Off-Broadway play based on the novel. In October 2010, a special educational DVD of the 2008 film version starring McKenzie became available free of charge to every high school library in the U.S. The educational DVD contains both a pre-screening and post-screening discussion guide for students in addition to a 15-minute featurette on the making of the film, the original movie's theatrical trailer, and a history of the original novel.

In early 2009, the 1971 film made its U.S. DVD debut, produced by Shout! Factory. The DVD included the film plus a 2005 documentary (Dalton Trumbo: Rebel In Hollywood), new cast interviews, an article about the film from American Cinematographer, Metallica's music video "One," behind-the-scenes footage with commentary by stars Timothy Bottoms and Jules Brenner, the 1940 radio adaptation starring James Cagney, and the original theatrical trailer. However, it contains some brief edits because a European print was used for the video source.

A TV film of the same name was made in Czechoslovakia in 1984.

References

External links 
 
 
 
 
 
 

1971 films
1971 drama films
American war drama films
Anti-war films about World War I
Films about amputees
Films about euthanasia
Films about veterans
Films based on American novels
Films set in the 1890s
Films set in the 1900s
Films set in the 1910s
Films scored by Jerry Fielding
Films with screenplays by Dalton Trumbo
Western Front (World War I) films

Cannes Grand Prix winners
1970s English-language films
1970s American films